Richard “Dick” Glyn Kimber (born 1939)  is an Australian historian and author who has written extensively on the history, art, culture and wildlife of Central Australia. He has published several books, the best known of which is Man From Arltunga: Walter Smith, Australian Bushman as well as more than 100 articles and essays. Kimber is also a Member of the Order of Australia.

Early life

Kimber was born at Freeling in South Australia in 1939. He went to school in the Riverland area and Brighton and then attended Adelaide University and Adelaide Teacher’s College.

Career

Throughout Kimber’s career, his focus has been on historical research, Aboriginal art and culture, and wildlife. He has published several books, the best known of which is Man From Arltunga: Walter Smith, Australian Bushman. He has also published over 100 articles and essays. He has also given public lectures and made regular media appearances.

Kimber moved to Alice Springs in 1970 and taught English, history, social science and Aboriginal Studies at Alice Springs High School. In 1974 he became the first Sacred Sites Officer in the Northern Territory for the Sacred Sites Authority, before returning to teaching. From 1976 to 1978 he was the Papunya Tula Artists Coordinator and devised Aboriginal Studies materials for schools, after which he again returned to teaching. Beginning in 1976 Kimber undertook research and prepared submissions for land rights and native title claims for over twenty years, in a private capacity and for the Central Land Council and Ngaanyatjarra Council. During this time he also undertook research for the Australian Institute of Aboriginal And Torres Strait Islander Studies, the Department of Aboriginal Affairs, the Australian Heritage Commission and the Strehlow Research Centre, regarding locations of Aboriginal homelands and their needs, settlement history, and ownership of sacred objects. He researched the historical records of extinct and rare native fauna for the Conservation Commission of the Northern Territory and provided advice regarding the development of the Alice Springs Desert Park and issues relating to Aboriginal land ownership of various parks and reserves.

From the mid-1990s, Kimber advised the National Museum of Australia, Museum Victoria and the Northern Territory Museum regarding Aboriginal artefacts and cultural practices, access to Papunya Tula paintings that incorporated sacred elements, and the return of sacred objects to traditional custodians in central Australia. He continues to consult for Museum Victoria is association with the Strehlow Research Centre.

Since arriving in Central Australia Kimber has undertaken travels, discussions and other shared experiences with many Aboriginal people, primarily in the south-western Simpson Desert, western deserts of Central Australia and the deserts of Western Australia through to the Canning Stock Route, and in Alice Springs. He has privately researched significant historical figures in inland Australia, Australian language usage, and native fauna of the inland including birds, and made important contributions to the Australian Language Dictionary, the Australian Dictionary of Biography and the Northern Territory Dictionary of Biography. The National Library of Australia has established the RG Kimber Collection for his correspondence and records.

Kimber was awarded an Order of Australia in 2001 for "services to the community through research projects and the recording of information of national interest in the areas of history, anthropology, Aboriginal art, ecology and land management practices in Central Australia". Kimber was awarded a Doctor of Letters, Honoris Causa from the Charles Darwin University in 2006.

Personal life
Kimber married to scientist Margaret Friedel in 1975. He has two children Steve and Barbara. In 1980, Kimber resigned from the Education Department “becoming Alice Springs’ first publicly acknowledged ‘house-husband’" while continuing his active writing life.

He is passionate about Australia Rules Football, lifesaving as well as history. He was the foundation captain and coach of the Melanka AFL Football Club (now West Football Club).

Works
 1988 - Wildbird dreaming: aboriginal art from the central deserts of Australia Nadine Amadio and Richard Kimber
 1986 - Man from Arltunga: Walter Smith, Australian bushman republished 1990
 1990 - Ancestor spirits: aspects of Australian Aboriginal life and spirituality by Max Charlesworth, Richard Kimber and Noel Wallace
 1900 - Friendly country - friendly people : an exhibition of Aboriginal artworks from the peoples of the Tanami and Great Sandy Deserts : desert lands, desert peoples, desert art
 1990 - Hunter-gatherer demography: the recent past in Central Australia
 1991 - The end of the bad old days: European settlement in Central Australia, 1871-1894
 2000 - M. N. Tjapaltjarri
 2006 - Colliding worlds: first contact in the Western Desert 1932-1984, edited by Philip Batty with essays by Dick Kimber, Jeremy Long and John Kean

References

External links
 Dick Kimber's Oral History interview

1939 births
Australian historians
People from Alice Springs
Living people
Members of the Order of Australia